The Birkirkara Tower, also known as Għar il-Ġobon Tower, is a tower in Birkirkara, Malta. Its date of construction is not known, but it is believed to date back to around the mid or late 16th century.

History

The tower was built for defensive purposes in the inland areas of Malta in the early periods of the Order of St. John. In the 17th century the tower was aided with the building of another tower, the Tal-Wejter Tower, to better facilitate communication with Floriana.

The tower was included on the Antiquities List of 1925. It is now scheduled as a Grade 1 national monument by the Malta Environment and Planning Authority, and it is also listed on the National Inventory of the Cultural Property of the Maltese Islands.

Architecture

Birkirkara Tower has a square plan, and its roof is surrounded by a high parapet wall. The latter contains six box machicolations; a pair at the left-side and two on the right-side, and one each at the front and back.

See also
Tal-Wejter Tower

References

Fortified towers in Malta
Birkirkara
Limestone buildings in Malta
Towers completed in the 16th century
National Inventory of the Cultural Property of the Maltese Islands
16th-century fortifications